Shubham Sharma may refer to:
 Shubham Sharma (cricketer, born 1993), Indian cricketer who plays for Madhya Pradesh
 Shubham Sharma (cricketer, born 1997), Indian cricketer who plays for Rajasthan